1632 Sieböhme, provisional designation , is an asteroid and relatively slow rotator from the middle region of the asteroid belt, approximately 27 kilometers in diameter. It was discovered on 26 February 1941, by German astronomer Karl Reinmuth at Heidelberg Observatory in southern Germany. It was later named after ARI-astronomer Siegfried Böhme.

Orbital characteristics 

Sieböhme orbits the Sun in the central main-belt at a distance of 2.3–3.0 AU once every 4 years and 4 months (1,581 days). Its orbit has an eccentricity of 0.14 and an inclination of 6° with respect to the ecliptic.

Physical characteristics 

In August 2012, two rotational lightcurves of Sieböhme were obtained at the Palomar Transient Factory in California, and by Italian astronomer Albino Carbognani. These lightcurves gave a rotation period of 56.8129 and 56.81 hours with a brightness variation of 0.44 and 0.45 magnitude, respectively. One month later, photometric observations by amateur astronomer Pierre Antonini gave a period of 56.65 hours and an amplitude of 0.47 magnitude. As most minor planets rotate within 2 to 20 hours around their axis, Sieböhme has a relatively long period, despite not being a slow rotator.

According to the survey carried out by NASA's Wide-field Infrared Survey Explorer with its subsequent NEOWISE mission, Sieböhme measures between 25.16 and 29.38 kilometers in diameter, and its surface has an albedo between 0.043 and 0.064. The Collaborative Asteroid Lightcurve Link (CALL) derives an albedo of 0.0477 and a diameter of 26.56 kilometers with an absolute magnitude of 11.80. Although CALL derives an albedo that is darker than that of a carbonaceous asteroid, it classifies Sieböhme as a stony asteroid.

Naming 

This minor planet was named in honor of German astronomer Siegfried Böhme (1909–1996), staff member at Astronomisches Rechen-Institut in Heidelberg since 1949. He improved upon the orbital elements of many asteroids, in particular upon 919 Ilsebill. The official  was published by the Minor Planet Center on 20 February 1976.

References

External links 
 Asteroid Lightcurve Database (LCDB), query form (info )
 Dictionary of Minor Planet Names, Google books
 Asteroids and comets rotation curves, CdR – Observatoire de Genève, Raoul Behrend
 Discovery Circumstances: Numbered Minor Planets (1)-(5000) – Minor Planet Center
 
 

001632
Discoveries by Karl Wilhelm Reinmuth
Named minor planets
19410226